The Mortensen-Nelson House, at 291 East 100 South in Moroni, Utah, USA, was built c.1885. It was listed on the National Register of Historic Places in 2003.

It is a one-and-a-half-story brick house upon a stone foundation, with a double cross-wing plan. It has paired decorative brackets. It was expanded c.1898.

References

Houses on the National Register of Historic Places in Utah
Victorian architecture in Utah
Residential buildings completed in 1885
Sanpete County, Utah